Season 13 of the American competitive reality television series Hell's Kitchen premiered on September 10, 2014 on Fox. The prize was a head chef position at Gordon Ramsay's  Pub & Grill at Caesars Atlantic City.  Gordon Ramsay returned as head chef and Andi van Willigan and James Avery returned as sous chefs. However, Jean-Philippe Susilovic did not return as maitre d' and was replaced by Marino Monferrato.

Kitchen Supervisor La Tasha McCutchen from Winter Haven, Florida won the competition.

Chefs
Eighteen chefs competed in season 13 for the first time since season 10.

{| class="wikitable sortable plainrowheaders" style=text-align:center 
! scope="col" | Contestant
! scope="col" | Age
! scope="col" | Occupation
! scope="col" | Hometown
! scope="col" | Result
|-
| scope="row" | La Tasha McCutchen
| style="text-align:center;" | 33
| Kitchen Supervisor
| Winter Haven, Florida
| Winner
|-
| scope="row" | Bryant Gallaher
| style="text-align:center;" | 29
|rowspan=2|Lead Line Cook
| Virginia Beach, Virginia
| Runner-Up
|-
| scope="row" | Sade Dancy
| style="text-align:center;"| 25
|rowspan=2|Philadelphia, Pennsylvania
|rowspan=2|Eliminated before Finals
|-
| scope="row" | Jennifer Salhoff
| style="text-align:center;" rowspan=3| 33
| Private Chef
|-
| scope="row" | Rosanne "Roe" DiLeo{{efn|Chef returned to Hells Kitchen again on Season 18, finished at 10th place.}}
| Head Chef
| Dallas, Texas
| Eliminated after Fourteenth Service
|-
| scope="row" | Brian Santos
| Sous Chef
| Boston, Massachusetts
| Eliminated after Thirteenth Service
|-
| scope="row" | Sterling Wright
| style="text-align:center;" | 40
| Grill Chef
| Nashville, Tennessee
| Eliminated after Twelfth Service
|-
| scope="row" | Fernando Cruz
| style="text-align:center;" rowspan=2| 28
| Executive Chef
| La Quinta, California
| Eliminated after Eleventh Service
|-
| scope="row" | Aaron Lhamon
| Lead Line Cook
| Maynard, Massachusetts
| Quit after Tenth Service
|-
| scope="row" | Frank Bilotti
| style="text-align:center;" | 26
|rowspan=2|Executive Chef
| Staten Island, New York
| Eliminated after Ninth Service
|-
| scope="row" | Steven "Steve" Rosenthal
| style="text-align:center;" | 34
| Detroit, Michigan
| Hospitalized before Ninth Service
|-
| scope="row" | Ashley Sherman
| style="text-align:center;" | 29
| Lead Line Cook
| Bethlehem, Pennsylvania
| Eliminated after Seventh Service
|-
| scope="row" | Katie McKeown
| style="text-align:center;" | 23
| Line Cook
| Dallas, Texas
| Eliminated after Sixth Service
|-
| scope="row" | Kalen Morgenstern
| style="text-align:center;" | 32
| Sous Chef
| River Oaks, Texas
| Eliminated after Fifth Service
|-
| scope="row" | James "JR" Robinson
| style="text-align:center;" | 29
| Private Chef
| Washington, D.C.
| Eliminated after Fourth Service
|-
| scope="row" | Denine Giordano
| style="text-align:center;" | 23
| Culinary Student
| Philadelphia, Pennsylvania
| Eliminated after Third Service
|-
| scope="row" | Janai Simpson
| style="text-align:center;" | 24
| Chef de Partie
| LaGrange, Georgia
| Eliminated after Second Service
|-
| scope="row" | John Paul "JP" DeDominicis
| style="text-align:center;" | 28
| Kitchen Manager
| Boston, Massachusetts
| Eliminated after First Service
|}
Notes

Contestant progress

Episodes

Epilogue
Two chefs from this season later appeared on the Food Network show Chopped''. Frank was on the season 37 episode "A Frog Leg Up."  Here, he was chopped (eliminated) in the entrée round after serving undercooked gnocchi to the judges. Roe appeared on the season 41 episode "Holy Bologna!" and was chopped after the dessert round.

Notes

References

Hell's Kitchen (American TV series)
2014 American television seasons